Mandal also spelled Mondal, is a  surname or title which is prevalent in India, Nepal and Bangladesh. The word "mandal" has various meanings depending upon the context, such as circle, orb, disc, ring, sphere, globe, orbit, province, assemblage or zone.

A mandal is an administrative circle under a district or revenue division, similar to a tehsil, in many parts of India. Originally this honorary title was given to the Administrator of provincial government.  'Mukhiya' or headman of a village was also conferred with this title. Sometimes this designation meant the person who as a representative of the Zamindar used to distribute land and also collect the revenue. 

In Bengal, the Mondal surname is found among Baishya Saha, Gandhabanik, Kayastha, Mahishya, Sadgop, Subarna Banik, Tili, Ugra Kshatriya and among the Scheduled Castes. It is also in vogue among Bengali Muslims and some Christians.

In Bihar, the Kurmi and Yadav community, and in Orissa some Karan and Khandayat use this surname. Rajdhoves and Khatbe people of Nepal have a Mandal surname.

Marhal or Mandal is also surname of a Jat clan, found mainly in Punjab and north-western Uttar Pradesh.

Mandal
 Abdul Majid Mandal, former MP of Sirajganj-5
 Abdur Rashid Mandal, MLA of Goalpara West
 Abu Saeed Muhammad Omar Ali Mandal (1919–2012), Bangladeshi Islamic scholar and translator
 B. P. Mandal (1918–1982), Indian parliamentarian who headed the Mandal Commission
 Shyama Prasad Mandal, Indian orthopedic surgeon and Padma Shri awardee
 Anil Kumar Mandal, Indian ophthalmologist and Shanti Swarup Bhatnagar Prize winner
 Swadhin Kumar Mandal, Indian Chemist and Shanti Swarup Bhatnagar Prize for Science and Technology awardee
 Nibir Mandal, Indian geologist and Shanti Swarup Bhatnagar Prize winner
 Manas Kumar Mandal, Indian psychologist
 Chitra Mandal, Indian chemical biologist
 Phanishwar Nath Mandal (1921–1977), one of the most influential writers of modern Hindi literature
 Lal Behari Dey Mandal, Indian author and Journalist
 Ananta Mandal, Indian artist
 Eugenia Mandal, Polish social psychologist
 Tarun Mandal (born 1959), Indian politician, belonging to the Socialist Unity Centre of India
 Satya Narayan Mandal, Nepalese politician and former minister
 Anil Mandal, Nepalese Cricketer, first batsman to score an International Century
 Shashwati Mandal, Hindustani Classical music vocalist
 Chitra Sen ( born Chitra Mandal ), Indian actress
 Rash Bihari Lal Mandal, Indian Zamindar and politician
 Shivnandan Prasad Mandal, Freedom fighter and politician

Fictional characters
 Tara Mandal, character in the British soap opera Coronation Street

Mondal
Abdul Khaleque Mondal, former politician and principal of Agardari Kamil Madrasa
Abdus Sattar Mondal, former MP of Rajshahi-4
Abhijit Mondal (born 1978), Indian footballer
Abhra Mondal (born 1986), Indian goalkeeper coach
Abu Ayesh Mondal, former MLA of Monteswar and former MP of Katwa
Anisul Islam Mondal, former MP of Rangpur-2
Arnab Mondal (born 1989), Indian footballer
 Arunoday Mondal, Indian physician, Padma Shri awardee, popularly known as "Sundarbaner Sujan"
Bina Mondal, Indian politician
 Deepak Mondal, Indian footballer and Arjuna Award winner
Dilip Mondal, Indian politician and state minister
Habibur Rehman Mondal, Indian professional footballer
Hira Mondal (born 1996), Indian footballer 
Jafar Mondal, goalkeeper for Churchill Brothers FC
 Joyita Mondal, India's first transgender judge and social worker from West Bengal
Junior Mondal, English professional footballer
Kamal Hasan Mondal (born 1982), Indian cricketer
 Khitish Chandra Mondal, Bangladeshi politician and former minister
Lata Mondal (born 1993), Bangladeshi cricketer
Mehbub Mondal, former MLA of Galsi
 Mimi Mondal, Indian speculative fiction writer based in New York
Mohammad Ebadot Hossain Mondal, former MP of Jessore-3
Monirul Mondal, striker for Mohammedan SC
Motiur Rohman Mondal, former MLA of Mankachar
Nur Mohammad Mondal, former MP of Rangpur-6
Pratima Mondal (born 1966), Indian politician
 Rabin Mondal, Indian artist and founding member of Calcutta painters
Rafikul Islam Mondal, former MLA of North Basirhat
Rahima Mondal, former MLA of Deganga
 Samir Mondal, Indian painter, credited with revival of watercolor painting
Sanchari Mondal, Indian actress
Sayan Mondal (born 1989), Indian cricketer
 Soma Mondal, first ever female chairperson of Steel Authority of India Limited
Sujit Mondal, Indian film director
 Shyamal Mondal, Indian politician and former minister of state

Mondol
Abdul Momin Mondol, MP of Sirajganj-5
Mohammad Hossain Mondol, director-general of Bangladesh Agricultural Research Institute
Ripon Mondol, Bangladeshi cricketer

See also
Mandala
Mandala (political model)
Rajamandala
Sand mandala
Sher Mandal

References

Indian surnames